"You Are the One" is a song written by Pat Patterson, performed by Carl Smith (with the Tunesmiths), and released by Columbia Records (catalog No. 21522). In June 1956, it entered Billboard magazine's country charts, peaked at No. 4 on the disc jockey chart (No. 5 juke box), and remained on the chart for 23 weeks.

References

Carl Smith (musician) songs
1953 songs